The 12141/42 Mumbai LTT -Patliputra Express is a daily express train service of the Central Railway Zone of Indian Railways. It runs between Lokmanya Tilak Terminus in Mumbai, Maharashtra and Patliputra Junction in Patna, Bihar.

History
This train was started in 1997 to facilitate the transportation of passengers from Mumbai to Patna. When it began, the train ran only on Tuesdays, and only from LTT to PNBE. When the Rajendranagar Terminal was inaugurated in 2003, service was extended from PNBE to RJPB. In 2009, the train line was again extended from LTT TO CSTM, therefore running from CSTM TO RJPB. Now this train is running between LTT to PPTA and it is known as LTT-Patliputra Express

Halts

Coach composition
This train has 22 LHB coach consisting of ONE AC First CUM AC 2 TIER, ONE 2 AC TIER, EIGHT 3 AC TIER, ONE PANTRY CAR, THREE NON RESERVED SECOND CLASS, SIX SLEEPER CLASS, and ONE Generator cum luggage van. The format is as follows:

Locomotives
Now this runs on electric traction from Mumbai LTT to Patliputra Jn. It is hauled by WAP 7 locomotive from Ajni shed or Kalyan Shed.

Halts
This train halts at 12 main stations, namely: Thane, Kalyan, Nasik, Manmad, Bhusawal, Itarsi, Jabalpur, Katni, Satna,   Mughalsarai, Zamania, Buxar, and Ara. This train halts at Kasara , Igatpuri, Itarsi, and katni because of technical and pantry reasons.

See also

 Lokmanya Tilak Terminus–Gorakhpur Express
 Pune - Danapur Superfast Express
 Lokmanya Tilak Terminus – Sultanpur Express

References

External links 
 indianrail.gov.in

Express trains in India
Rail transport in Bihar
Rail transport in Maharashtra
Transport in Patna
Transport in Mumbai
Rail transport in Madhya Pradesh
Rail transport in Uttar Pradesh
Railway services introduced in 1997